L'Argent is a novel by Émile Zola.

L'Argent may also refer to:

 L'Argent (1928 film), a silent film by Marcel L'Herbier
 L'Argent (1936 film), a film starring Véra Korène
 L'Argent (1983 film), a film by Robert Bresson
 L'Argent (1988 film), a film for TV directed by Jacques Rouffio

See also 
 Argent (disambiguation)